Yujiapu Financial District (also Yujiabao) is a central business district currently under construction in the Binhai New Area of Tianjin. The area is envisioned as a potential center for world trade and finance. The district is being developed with a total investment of about 200 billion yuan, and is located on the Hai River North Shore, along with the  Xiangluowan Business District and Tianjin Economic-Technological Development Area (TEDA). Also, the Yujiapu Financial District is an APEC low-carbon demonstration town. The district is modeled after New York City's Manhattan.

Location
Yujiapu is a peninsula located in the core area of the Tianjin Binhai New Area; it covers the entire block east, west and south facing the Hai River, an area totaling . From the air, the whole Yujiapu region is shaped like a "pocketbook", is the upper hand in Sheung Shui land. It is already under construction on the west side of Xiangluowan business district, south of the future will be planning the construction of ecological residential area, east of the island shaped like a whale. To the west there is the Hai Kaiqi Bridge, with the Yongtai Rd traveling east–west in the north, and Sanhuai Rd traversing the peninsula from the north to the south.

Ghost city
The district was expected to open in June 2014, but has suffered from a construction slowdown.

One local was quoted as saying “All of these tall buildings just appeared.” In addition the "area is prone to flooding from storm surges and heavy rain" as it is “built on coastal salt flats just a few inches above sea level.. as a local resident told the Times in 2012, after nasty weather… “you had to roll up your pants and take off your shoes to walk across the street.”  As of 2015, construction was halted on many projects as the builders packed up and left the city, as the $50 billion project was heavily in debt.

Around 2016, property buyers started moving into the district. In 2019, some government functional agencies of the Tianjin Economic and Technological Development Zone Administrative Committee moved to Baoxin Building in Yujiapu.

Buildings
, of the nearly 41 projects that can be seen in Xiangluo Bay, nearly 22 buildings are still in an unfinished state.
There are a number of substantial buildings under construction on the peninsula, including:

 Liqin Hotel
 Yujiapu Administrative
 Shangbang Leasing Tower
 Shenglong International Finance Center
 Yujiapu Twin Tower I and II
 Zheshang Building
 Wenzhou Building
 China Shipbuilding Heavy Industry Building
 R&F Guangdong Building

Across the bridge in the Xiangluowan Business District there are a number of buildings, including:

 Binhai Cathay Tower
 AVIC International Plaza
 R and F Tower
 Zovie Plaza I and II
 Guangyao Dongfang Plaza Tower I and II

Note also the Yujiapu Free Trade Zone.

See also
Sino-Singapore Tianjin Eco-city
Yujiapu Railway Station
Kangbashi New Area, a new highly urbanized district of Ordos City that was initially without activity

References

External links
 China's Manhattan Knock-off, The China Chronicle
 No longer a ghost town

Districts of Tianjin
Economy of Tianjin
Replica constructions in China